In hockey, the slot is the area on the hockey rink directly in front of the goaltender between the faceoff circles and extending to the top of the face off circles.  It is sometimes referred to as the "scoring area".

The "high" slot extends from the highest points of the faceoff circles to the hash marks. Similarly, the "low" slot extends from the crease to the hash marks.

Ice hockey terminology